HIStory on Film, Volume II is a collection of music videos by Michael Jackson released by Sony Music Video Enterprises in May 1997. It contains the music videos belonging to Jackson's ninth studio album (HIStory: Past, Present and Future - Book I) and first remix album (Blood on the Dance Floor: HIStory in the Mix), as well as content featured in Jackson's previous video collection, including "Thriller" and "Beat It".

Track listing (DVD)

Side one
 Programme Start
 HIStory Teaser Trailer – 3:58
 "Billie Jean" – 5:05 (performance from Motown 25: Yesterday, Today and Forever) (Thriller, 1982)
 "Beat It" – 4:56 (Thriller, 1982)
 "Liberian Girl" – 5:43 (Bad, 1987)
 "Smooth Criminal" – 9:47 (Bad, 1987)
 1995 MTV Video Music Awards Performance – 15:27
 "Don't Stop 'Til You Get Enough" / "The Way You Make Me Feel" / "Scream" / "Black or White" / "Billie Jean" (Contains Excerpts from "Jam", "Thriller" and "Beat It")
 "Dangerous"
 "You Are Not Alone"
 "Thriller" – 13:43 (Thriller, 1982)

Side two
 "Scream (Radio Edit)" (vocal duet between Michael Jackson and Janet Jackson, original video) – 5:00 (HIStory: Past, Present and Future, Book I, 1995)
 "Childhood" (Theme from "Free Willy 2") – 4:33 (HIStory: Past, Present and Future, Book I, 1995)
 "You Are Not Alone" – 5:47 (HIStory: Past, Present and Future, Book I, 1995)
 "Earth Song" – 7:49 (HIStory: Past, Present and Future, Book I, 1995)
 "They Don't Care About Us" – 7:17 (Brazilian version) (HIStory: Past, Present and Future, Book I, 1995)
 "Stranger in Moscow" – 5:38 (HIStory: Past, Present and Future, Book I, 1995)
 "Blood on the Dance Floor (Refugee Camp Mix)" – 5:40
 "Brace Yourself" – 3:22

Notes 

 The version of "Smooth Criminal" included is different from the one featured in Moonwalker, with a shorter interlude and different music at the start.
 "You Are Not Alone" features "angel scenes".
 "Earth Song" includes sound effects, such as the chainsaw, as well as a message at the end, describing the shooting of the film.
 After "Stranger in Moscow", a track entitled "MJ Megaremix" (10:36) was released only on the earliest VHS, Laserdisc, and VCD pressings of this collection. It was removed from the DVD format for unspecified reasons.

DVD features
This refers to the UK Region 2 release. Other regions may vary.

 PCM Stereo
 Dolby Digital 5.1
 Instant lyrics for chapter access (can be on/off)

Intros
Before each video starts, an intro with the title of the video is shown. (Two of the videos lack intros: "Teaser" and "Brace Yourself".)

Certifications

Notes

1997 video albums
Michael Jackson video albums